Mulu is a town in eastern Ethiopia, located in the Sitti Zone of the Somali Regional State. It is the main town of Mieso district. Mulu is served by a station on the Addis Ababa-Djibouti railroad.

The missionaries Carl Wilhelm Isenberg and Johann Ludwig Krapf paused for several days at Mulu, during their 1839 journey from the coast to Shewa, and described it as "nothing but a vast plain covered with stones, with a little verdure in patches, a few acacias, and hovels made of boughs here and there".

Based on figures from the Central Statistical Agency in 2005, Mulu has an estimated total population of 3,812, of whom 1,991 are men and 1,821 are women. The 1994 census did not provide separate figures for this town.

References 

Populated places in the Somali Region